Oswald Orth (1832 – 13 December 1920) was the first professor of English Literature at the University of Liège.

Life
Orth was born in 1832 in Weilbach, now a subdivision of Flörsheim am Main, in the Duchy of Nassau. In 1869 he obtained a doctorate from the University of Rostock with a thesis on the philosophy of history. He became a teacher of German at the Athénée royal de Liège. At the creation of the department of Germanic philology of the University of Liège in 1890, he was appointed to teach English philology, comparative grammar of the Germanic languages, and historical grammar of German. He was president of the organising committee of the second conference of the Association belge des professeurs de langues vivantes, held in September 1909.

Orth retired in 1904, and was succeeded as professor of English Literature by his former doctoral student, Paul Hamelius, and in comparative grammar by Joseph Mansion. At his death, in 1920, he bequeathed his personal library to the university.

References

1832 births
1920 deaths
Philologists
Academic staff of the University of Liège